The Ned Ashton House in Iowa City, Iowa, also known as the Edward L. Ashton House or as Ashton House, was built in 1947-1948 and listed on the National Register of Historic Places in 2001.

The house was built in 1947 by Edward L. "Ned" Ashton as a private residence.  Ashton, who has been called "the most distinguished bridge engineer in the history of Iowa," was a professor of civil engineering at the University of Iowa from 1943 to 1957. He designed several bridges over the Mississippi River, as well as smaller bridges such as the Benton Street Bridge, and was a pioneer in the design of welded plate girder bridges.

The single-story ranch house, built from stone and concrete, shows Prairie School influence in the way it was incorporated into its location alongside the Iowa River. Both the main and lower levels of the house provided excellent views of the river.

Flooding and Acquisition by Iowa City

The basement level of the Ashton House was flooded in both
the Great Flood of 1993 and the Iowa flood of 2008.
The latter flood caused an estimated $177,247 in damages
to the property, valued at $487,388 prior to the flood.

Following the 2008 flood, Iowa City began
buying up flooded properties.  As of Oct. 25, 2011, the
city had purchased the Ashton House.  By the end of the buy-out program in mid-2012, the city had purchased all but one neighboring house, with demolition slated for completion before 2013.  The city plans to preserve the Ned Ashton House, renting it out as a venue for such events as receptions and meetings.

See also
National Register of Historic Places listings in Johnson County, Iowa

References

Prairie School architecture in Iowa
Houses on the National Register of Historic Places in Iowa
Houses completed in 1948
Houses in Iowa City, Iowa
National Register of Historic Places in Iowa City, Iowa